Maria Avelina Alvarez (born 14 October 1961) is a Portuguese gymnast. She competed in five events at the 1980 Summer Olympics.

References

External links
 

1961 births
Living people
Portuguese female artistic gymnasts
Olympic gymnasts of Portugal
Gymnasts at the 1980 Summer Olympics
Place of birth missing (living people)
20th-century Portuguese women